This is a list of anthologies of poetry.

A–C
American Poetry Since 1950, 1993
Anthology of Twentieth-Century British and Irish Poetry, 2001.
Anthology of Modern Serbian Lyric, 1911.
Book of Aneirin (c. 1265) Welsh medieval manuscript
Best American Poetry series
Best New Poets seriesBlack Dog, Black Night, Contemporary Vietnamese PoetryBook of Bodley Head Verse, 1926.
Breaking Ground/Abriendo Caminos: Anthology of Puerto Rican Writers in New York, edited by Myrna Nieves, 2012.British Poetry since 1945', 1970.
Broadview Anthology of Poetry, 1993.
Children of Albion: Poetry of the Underground in Britain, 1969.
Conductors of Chaos: A Poetry Anthology, 1996.
Contes et nouvelles en vers (1665), ribald tales collected and versified by Jean de La Fontaine
Cradle Songs: An Anthology of Poems on Motherhood edited by Sharmagne Leland-St. John and Rachelle Yousuf. Publisher: Quill and Parchment Press

E - K
Earth Poems: Poems from Around the World to Honor the Earth edited by Ivo Mosley
Englands Helicon, 1600.
Faber Book of Irish Verse, 1974.
Faber Book of Modern American Verse, 1956.
Faber Book of Modern Verse, 1936.
Faber Book of Twentieth Century Verse, 1953.
The FSG Book of Twentieth-Century Latin American Poetry (Farrar, Straus, & Giroux) edited by Ilan Stavans and Harold Augenbraum, 2011.
 Floricanto Si!: A Collection of Latina Poetry (Penguin) edited by Bryce Milligan and Angela de Hoyos, 1998.
From the Other Side of the Century: "A New American Poetry, 1960-1990", 1994.
Georgian Poetry
Golden Treasury of Scottish Poetry edited by Hugh MacDiarmid, 1940.
GlassFire Anthology
Greek Anthology, 10th and 14th century.
Green Book of Poetry edited by Ivo Mosley
The Harvill Book of Twentieth-Century Poetry in English, 1999.
Hinterland: Caribbean Poetry from the West Indies and Britain, 1989.
Hyakunin Isshu (13th century) (one hundred people, one poem) compiled by the 13th-century Japanese poet and critic Fujiwara no Teika, an important collection of Japanese waka poems from the 7th through the 13th centuries.
Kaifūsō (751) (Fond Recollections of Poetry) the oldest collection of Chinese poetry (kanshi) written by Japanese poets
Kokin Wakashū (completed around 905) (collection of Japanese poems from ancient and current times) the first Japanese Imperial poetry anthology

L - O
Lieblingminne und Freundesliebe in der Weltliteratur
Man'yōshū (around 759) (Anthology of a Myriad Leaves) the first great Japanese poetry anthology, compiled by the poet Ōtomo no Yakamochi
Metrical Dindshenchas
Modern Scottish Poetry (Faber)
The Best Loved Poems of the American People
The New British Poetry
The New American Poetry (1945-1960))
New Poets of England and America
The New Poetry, A. Alvarez ed.
New Provinces, F.R. Scott ed.
New Oxford Book of English Verse 1250-1950
Other: British and Irish Poetry since 1970
Oxford Book of Contemporary Verse
Oxford Book of English Mystical Verse
Oxford Book of English Verse
Oxford Book of Modern Verse 1892–1935
The Oxford Book of Twentieth Century English Verse
Oxford Book of Welsh Verse in English
Oxford poetry anthologies
Oxford period poetry anthologies
Oxford religious poetry anthologies
The Oxford India Anthology of Twelve Modern Indian Poets ed. by Arvind Krishna Mehrotra, Published by Oxford University Press, New Delhi

P - Z

Palgrave's Golden Treasury, 1861.
Penguin Book of Canadian Verse, 1942.
Penguin Book of Contemporary British Poetry, 1982.
Penguin Book of Contemporary Verse (1918–1960)
Penguin Book of Modern African Poetry, 1984.
Penguin Book of Modern American Verse, 1954.
The Penguin Book of Modern Australian Poetry, 1991.
Penguin poetry anthologies
Penguin Modern Poets, 1960s and 1970s.
Percy Folio, 17th century.
Poem and Poet
Poems for the Hazara
Poems of Black Africa ed. by Wole Soyinka, 1975.
Poems of Today
Poetry Speaks Expanded ed. by Elise Paschen and Rebekah Presson Mosby, 2007.
Postmodern American Poetry, 1994.
Reliques of Ancient English Poetry, 1765.
Shi Jing
The Top 500 Poems (1992) ed. by William Harmon and published by Columbia University Press
These Are Not Sweet Girls: Poetry by Latin American Women, ed. by Marjorie Agosín (1994)
Theragatha and Therigatha
Three Chinese Poets translated by Vikram Seth
Tottel's Miscellany, 1557.
Up The Line To Death, 1964.
The Wake Forest Book of Irish Women's Poetry, 1967-2000
World Poetry Tree: An Anthology for Hope, Love and Peace, 2022.

See also
List of Classical Chinese poetry anthologies
List of poems
List of poetry collections
List of poetry groups and movements
Lists of poets
List of Japanese Anthologies
List of years in poetry
List of years in literature
Anthology listings by editor
Arthur St. John Adcock
Richard Aldington
Donald Allen
Kingsley Amis
Henry Charles Beeching
W. H. Davies
Cecil Day-Lewis
Walter de la Mare
G. S. Fraser
John Gawsworth
Geoffrey Grigson
Paul Hoover
Elizabeth Jennings
John Lehmann
Jack Lindsay
Jaydeep Sarangi
Robert Wilson Lynd
Harold Monro
Ivo Mosley
Thomas Moult
Douglas Messerli
Michael Roberts
J. C. Squire
William Kean Seymour
The Sitwells
Ron Silliman
Eliot Weinberger
Anthology listings by group
The Movement
Anthology listings by publisher
The Bodley Head
Anthology Awards
EPPIE Award for Poetry in an Anthology

References

Poetry anthologies, List of
 

Poetry-related lists